AT&T Center is a multi-purpose indoor arena on the east side of San Antonio, Texas, United States. It is the home of the San Antonio Spurs of the National Basketball Association.

The arena seats 18,418 for basketball, and 19,000 for concerts or gatherings, and contains 2,018 club seats, 50 luxury suites and 32 bathrooms. It was opened in 2002 as the SBC Center, at a cost of US$175 million, financed by county-issued bonds, which were supported by a hotel-occupancy and car-rental tax increase and an additional contribution of $28.5 million from the Spurs. SBC Communications, Inc., purchased the naming rights to the facility under a 20-year, $41 million naming rights agreement with Bexar County, the San Antonio Spurs, and the San Antonio Stock Show & Rodeo in July 2000. SBC Communications changed its name to AT&T Inc. in November 2005. The arena officially changed its name to AT&T Center in January 2006. On July 2, 2021, it was announced that AT&T will not renew its contract for the name at the venue, meaning that a new name could come soon as the deal ends in fall 2022.

From 2003 to 2017, the arena was home to the San Antonio Stars of the Women's National Basketball Association. It was the home of the San Antonio Rampage of the American Hockey League from 2002 until 2020.

Alamodome 

Previously, the Spurs played at the Alamodome, a multi-purpose facility with a configuration that allowed half the floor space to be used for basketball. Although the Alamodome was still relatively new (opening in 1993), it had become clear over the years that the Spurs were using it for most of the year, making it difficult to schedule contiguous dates for conventions or even a regular-season football schedule.  The Alamodome's seating capacity could be expanded to 35,000 for popular regular-season opponents, and attracted nearly 40,000 for a 1999 NBA Finals game.  Although it had been designed with the Spurs in mind, the Spurs and their fans grew increasingly dissatisfied with the facility because of its poor sight lines and cavernous feel.  The Alamodome's basketball configuration had the basketball court at one end of where the football field would have been, leaving almost half of the stadium curtained off.  Being primarily a football stadium differentiated the Alamodome from most other NBA facilities, including the Spurs' previous home, HemisFair Arena.

Additionally, since the Alamodome opened, there had been a plethora of new arena construction including facilities such as Conseco Fieldhouse (now Gainbridge Fieldhouse), which, in addition to offering an intimate atmosphere, offered teams several new revenue generating opportunities, including suites located on the lower levels and large club level seating areas.

New facility

The Spurs campaigned for several years for a new facility. The Spurs and the city had come to an agreement to build a new facility adjacent to the Alamodome, but in a last-minute reversal, the team partnered with Bexar County to construct a new arena adjacent to the Freeman Coliseum. As a part of the agreement, the facility would be home to the Spurs, a new ice hockey team (what became the Rampage), and the San Antonio Stock Show & Rodeo event.

The facility would be funded through an increase of hotel and car rental taxes, and Bexar County voters approved the plan in November 1999. Coincidentally, the election was held on the same day the Spurs received their NBA Championship rings for their first NBA championship.

Rick Pych is the Chief Development Officer of the AT&T Center and led the Spurs franchise through its development, construction and opening in 2002.

Unlike most arenas that can accommodate basketball and ice hockey, AT&T Center was primarily designed for basketball. Nevertheless, it can accommodate an NHL-sized ice hockey rink, but it can only accommodate a maximum of 16,151 people for ice hockey since the seating arrangement for ice hockey is asymmetrical. There are only a few permanent rows of seating on the lower level of the west end, and all of the upper-level sets on the west end of the arena have obstructed views. This would result in poor sightlines. However, the seating capacity for Rampage games is under 7,000 people, making the upper level not necessary for those events.

In 2012, the Rampage renamed the press box to the "Jessica Redfield Press Box" after Jessica Redfield, an aspiring news broadcaster and a former team intern who was killed in the Aurora theater shooting.

Construction
After the arena referendum passed, planning quickly began for construction on the new facility. Naming rights were obtained in July 2000 when an agreement was reached with San Antonio-based SBC Communications to name the new arena the SBC Center. The agreement was reported to be for a total of $41 million over 20 years.

Ground was officially broken on the facility in August 2000. The arena's basic design was similar to many of the other newer arenas in the NBA, thanks to the choice of Minneapolis-based Ellerbe Becket as the primary architects. A nationally recognized, local architecture firm, Lake/Flato, was teamed with Ellerbe Becket to work on the design of the structure. Lake/Flato is responsible for introducing a South Texas vernacular to the overall look of the arena. Ellerbe Becket was responsible for designing the Gainbridge Fieldhouse in Indianapolis and Capital One Arena in Washington, D.C.

Renovations
On December 9, 2014, the Bexar County Commissioners Court gave Spurs Sports and Entertainment permission to begin up to $101.5 million in renovations to the AT&T Center.

The renovations started in the summer of 2015, when the San Antonio Spurs ended the 2015 season. They are planned to include a new scoreboard, updated televisions inside and outside of the arena, a new state of the art sound system, and improved WIFI that will cover about 90% of the venue. Expansions to the fan shop and other major parts of the AT&T Center are also in the plans. The renovations were funded by a 2008 tax increase for improvements to the Tobin Center, parts of the Mission Reach expansion, and the rodeo grounds located next to the AT&T Center.

Notable events
In addition to many local community and sporting events, the center hosts San Antonio Sports Car Association autocross competitions in the parking lot each month.

The Professional Rodeo Cowboys Association holds the San Antonio Stock Show & Rodeo and an Xtreme Bulls tour event annually there.  The Rodeo is held in February, necessitating the Spurs and Rampage to make long road trips during this time (commonly referred to as the "Rodeo Road Trip").

On the weekend of August 1–2, 2009, the Professional Bull Riders hosted a Built Ford Tough Series event there (an event previously held at the Alamodome in 2007 and 2008).  Since May 2013, the venue has also hosted the annual Bud Light River City Rockfest.

On October 1, 2016, the arena hosted the Kellogg's Tour of Gymnastics Champions.

The arena has also hosted many WWE events including numerous episodes of WWE Raw and WWE SmackDown and the following pay-per views: Royal Rumble (2007), TLC: Tables, Ladders & Chairs (2009), Vengeance (2011),  and Hell in a Cell (2018).

In 2014, UFC Fight Night: Swanson vs. Stephens was held at the arena. On July 20, 2019, UFC on ESPN: dos Anjos vs. Edwards was held at the AT&T Center. The event broke the record for most decisions in a row on one fight card.

Black Sabbath played their final show in the United States here on November 12, 2016.

On July 27 & 28, 2019, the arena hosted its first Hot Wheels Monster Trucks Live event.

References

Further reading
Transforming San Antonio. Nelson W. Wolff (Trinity University Press, 2008).

External links

 AT&T Center Home Page
 AT&T Center at SeatGeek

AT&T
Indoor ice hockey venues in the United States
Basketball venues in Texas
Gymnastics venues in Texas
Mixed martial arts venues in Texas
National Basketball Association venues
Event venues established in 2002
San Antonio Rampage
San Antonio Stars venues
San Antonio Spurs venues
Sports venues in San Antonio
2002 establishments in Texas
Indoor arenas in Texas
Sports venues completed in 2002
Rodeo venues in the United States
Spurs Sports & Entertainment